Holy Trinity Church, Ashford-in-the-Water is a Grade II listed parish church in the Church of England in Ashford-in-the-Water, Derbyshire.

History
The Church dates from the 12th century. While some 13th-century parts remain – notably the south door with its original Norman decorative stone arch tympanum featuring carvings of a wild boar and other creatures, and also parts of the west tower – the church underwent extensive remodelling, including restoring the tympanum to its rightful place, between 1868 and 1870 by J.M. and H. Taylor, and was reopened on 24 June 1870 by the Bishop of Lichfield.

Parish status
The church is in a joint parish with:
All Saints' Church, Bakewell
St Anne's Church, Over Haddon
St Katherine's Church, Rowsley
St Michael and All Angels' Church, Sheldon

Organ
A new organ was installed in 1928 by J Housley Adkins. A specification of the organ can be found on the National Pipe Organ Register.

Bells
The church tower contains a ring of 6 bells, 4 cast in 1954, and 2 in 1966 by John Taylor of Loughborough. There is also a Sanctus bell dating from 1699, also known as locals as the 'Pancake Bell'.

See also
Listed buildings in Ashford-in-the-Water

References

Ashford in the Water
Ashford in the Water